Palashi Monument is a monument in Palashi (Plassey), Nadia district, in the state of West Bengal. This was erected in memory of the Battle of Plassey fought between Sir Robert Clive, commander of the British East India Company and Nawab Siraj ud-Daulah on 23 June 1757. The monument is under preservation of Archaeological Survey of India. In 2007, on the 250th anniversary of the battle, a statue of Siraj ud-Daulah was established by All India Forward Bloc leader Debabrata Biswas (politician) on behalf of India-Pakistan-Bangladesh People's Forum.

Location
The monument was established in the bank of the Bhagirathi River and beside Plassey Suger Mill which is popularly known as plassey battlefield. But the actual battlefield has been partially washed away by a shift of the river. The place is located from almost 150 km. from Kolkata and 7 km from the Plassey railway station.

References

Towers in India
Monuments and memorials in West Bengal
Martyrs' monuments and memorials
Indian military memorials and cemeteries
Tourist attractions in Nadia district